The 2018 Brest Challenger was a professional tennis tournament played on hard courts. It was the fourth edition of the tournament which was part of the 2018 ATP Challenger Tour. It took place in Brest, France between 22 and 28 October 2018.

Singles main-draw entrants

Seeds

 1 Rankings are as of 15 October 2018.

Other entrants
The following players received wildcards into the singles main draw:
  Antoine Cornut Chauvinc
  Corentin Denolly
  Antoine Hoang
  Matteo Martineau

The following players received entry into the singles main draw as special exempts:
  Filippo Baldi
  Gleb Sakharov

The following players received entry from the qualifying draw:
  Benjamin Bonzi
  Ivan Gakhov
  Calvin Hemery
  Tak Khunn Wang

The following player received entry as a lucky loser:
  Tomislav Brkić

Champions

Singles

  Hubert Hurkacz def.  Ričardas Berankis, 7–5, 6–1.

Doubles

  Sander Gillé /  Joran Vliegen def.  Leander Paes /  Miguel Ángel Reyes-Varela 3–6, 6–4, [10–2].

References

2018 ATP Challenger Tour
Brest Challenger
2018 in French tennis